Zelentsino is a rural locality (a village) in Karinskoye Rural Settlement, Alexandrovsky District, Vladimir Oblast, Russia. The population was 73 as of 2010. There are 10 streets.

Geography 
Zelentsino is located 15 km south of Alexandrov (the district's administrative centre) by road. Karabanovo is the nearest rural locality.

References 

Rural localities in Alexandrovsky District, Vladimir Oblast